Deborah Fraser (June 9, 1965 – May 15, 2022)  was a South African gospel singer. She began her career in 1985 as a backing singer, and recorded her own album in 2000, titled Abanye bayombona, which became commercial success sold over 1 million copies in South Africa. 

Fraser's tenth studio album  Uhambo (2016), produced hit single "Ngeke ngiyeke ukuthandaza".

She won the first SABC Crown Gospel Music award in the Best Female Artist category, among other awards SAMA for best gospel, Metro award for best gospel, and Kora for best gospel artist.

Career 

In 1984, Fraser relocated to Johannesburg and worked as the backup vocalist  for Ladysmith Black Mambazo, Lucky Dube, Brenda Fassie, Rebecca Malope, Hugh Masekela, Jonas Gwangwa.

In the year 2000, her first studio album Abanye Bayombona, was released. Following the success of her first album she was signed by Universal Music. 

In September 2008, she bagged  a role as a  Judges on Shine gospel show.

In April 2010, Fraser made her screen debut on drama series, Hola Mpinji! playing role of Ebony.

At the 23rd ceremony of South African Music Awards her album Uhambo was nominated for  Best Traditional Faith Album.

On 12 April 2019, her studio album OkaJehova Akanqotshwa was released.

Personal life

Fraser was married to Nigerian pastor Sockey Okeke. In October 2021, Fraser was honored by the Trinity International Bible University with a doctorate of philosophy in the sacred space of music.

Death 

She died on 15 May 2022 at the age of 56, at Chris Hani Baragwanath Academic Hospital, after suffering a stroke.

Discography

Studio albums

References

External links
 
 

1965 births
2022 deaths
20th-century South African women singers
South African gospel singers
Singers from Johannesburg
People from eThekwini Metropolitan Municipality
21st-century South African women singers